Vladica Ćurčić (born 18 July 1978 in Ivanjica) is a former Serbian football player.

References

1978 births
People from Ivanjica
Living people
Serbia and Montenegro footballers
FK Javor Ivanjica players
FC Spartak Vladikavkaz players
Russian Premier League players
Serbia and Montenegro expatriate footballers
Expatriate footballers in Russia
FC Kairat players
Expatriate footballers in Kazakhstan
FC Vostok players
FC Aktobe players
Expatriate footballers in Uzbekistan
FC Zhetysu players
FC Shakhter Karagandy players
Kazakhstan Premier League players
Association football midfielders